Boophone disticha is a bulbous tropical and subtropical flowering plant, endemic to Africa. Commonly called the century plant or tumbleweed, Boophone disticha was first collected in 1781 from South Africa by Swedish botanist Carl Peter Thunberg and described by Carl Linnaeus as Amaryllis disticha. Since that time it has been placed in the genera Brunsvigia and Haemanthus, finally coming to rest as Boophone. The genus itself was written in three ways (Boophone, Boophane and Buphane) by the author William Herbert, straining the procedures of the rules of nomenclature. The etymology of the genus is from the Greek  = ox, and = killer of, a clear warning that eating the plant can be fatal to livestock.

The genus as currently understood includes two or possibly three species. B. disticha is one of the most widely distributed bulbous species in South Africa, readily identified by its fan-like appearance and its bulb half-protruding from the ground. The Khoi, Bushmen and Bantu were aware of its poisonous nature and used parts of the plant medicinally and as an arrow poison. The principal compounds are eugenol - an aromatic, volatile oil smelling of cloves and having analgesic properties, and the toxic alkaloids buphandrin, crinamidine and buphanine, the latter having an effect akin to that of scopolamine and if taken in quantity may lead to agitation, stupor, strong hallucinations and (if over-ingested) coma or death.

This species produces a single inflorescence before the arrival of the season's new leaves. While maturing the fruiting head's pedicels undergo a stiffening process and remarkable elongation to some 300mm. When the fruiting head separates at its junction with the stalk, it is easily moved by light breezes, scattering seeds as it rolls.

Native distribution and habitat
Boophone disticha is native to Angola, Botswana, Burundi, the Democratic Republic of the Congo, Eswatini, Kenya, Lesotho, Malawi, Mozambique, Namibia, Rwanda, South Africa (in the provinces of Eastern Cape, Free State, Gauteng, KwaZulu-Natal, Limpopo, Mpumalanga, Western Cape), Tanzania, Uganda, Zambia, and Zimbabwe. It grows wild in dry savannas, grasslands, and glades in forests.

Uses
Boophone disticha has been used locally to make poison for arrow's tips, and in the treatment of equine piroplasmosis.

The bulb has a wide range of uses in traditional African medicine. It contains alkaloids such as lycorine, undulatine, buphanisine, buphanamine, nerbowdine, crinine, crinamidine, distichamine, 3O-acetyl-nerbowdine, buphacetine and buphanidrine which have analgesic and hallucinogenic properties.

Material from this species' bulb was associated with preservation of the Khoi Kouga mummy found in the Langkloof.

References

External links

 

Plants described in 1781
Flora of West-Central Tropical Africa
Flora of Sudan
Flora of East Tropical Africa
Flora of South Tropical Africa
Flora of Southern Africa
Amaryllidoideae